Bacelarella gibbosa is a species of jumping spider in the genus Bacelarella that lives in Nigeria. It was first described in 2012.

References

Endemic fauna of Nigeria
Salticidae
Fauna of Nigeria
Spiders described in 2012
Spiders of Africa
Taxa named by Wanda Wesołowska